The 2014–15 OK Liga Femenina was the eighth edition of Spain's premier women's rink hockey championship.

Palau de Plegamans won its first title ever.

Teams

League table

Copa de la Reina

The 2015 Copa de la Reina was the 10th edition of the Spanish women's roller hockey cup. As in the previous year, it was played in Lloret de Mar, this time between the eight first qualified teams after the first half of the season.

Manlleu won its first title ever after beating 3–2 Voltregà in the final.

References

External links
RFEP official website

2014 in roller hockey
2015 in roller hockey
OK Liga Femenina seasons
2014 in Spanish sport
2015 in Spanish sport